The Oklahoma State Cowboys and Cowgirls are the intercollegiate athletic teams that represent Oklahoma State University, located in Stillwater. The program's mascot is a cowboy named Pistol Pete. Oklahoma State participates at the National Collegiate Athletic Association (NCAA)'s Division I Football Bowl Subdivision (FBS) as a member of the Big 12 Conference. The university's current athletic director is Chad Weiberg, who replaced the retiring Mike Holder on July 1, 2021. In total, Oklahoma State has 52 NCAA team national titles, which ranks fifth in most NCAA team national championships. These national titles have come in wrestling (34), golf (11), basketball (2), baseball (1), and cross country (4).

Athletics history and tradition

Prior to 1957, Oklahoma State University was known as Oklahoma A&M.  As was common with most land-grant schools, its teams were known for many years as the Aggies, though they were sometimes also called the Tigers. However, in 1923, A&M was looking for a new mascot to replace its pet tiger (the inspiration behind the school colors of orange and black). A group of students saw famed cowboy Frank Eaton leading the Armistice Day parade. He was approached to see if he would be interested in being the model for the new mascot, and he agreed.  The caricature acquired the nickname "Pistol Pete."

Only a few decades removed from the cattle drive era, the cowboy was still an important figure in the Southwest. The new mascot had become so popular that by 1924, Charles Saulsberry, sports editor of The Oklahoma Times, began calling A&M's teams the "Cowboys."  "Aggies" and "Cowboys" were used interchangeably until A&M was elevated to university status in 1957. In 1958, the "Pistol Pete" caricature was formally adopted as Oklahoma State's mascot, though it had been used unofficially for over three decades before then.

The Waving Song
The "Waving Song" is one of the fight songs for Oklahoma State. At Oklahoma State football games, the song is played by the Cowboy Marching Band during the pregame traditions, following touchdowns, and after victories against the Cowboys' opponents. For other athletic events, the Waving Song is played after Oklahoma State victories as the start of the fight song trilogy.  While the song is played, fans wave their right arms in the air; the effect is similar to wheat waving in the wind.

The song's melody is that of "The Streets of New York," a song from the Victor Herbert operetta, The Red Mill. The lyrics used by Oklahoma State were written by H.G. Seldomridge, a professor at what was then Oklahoma A&M who heard the tune on a visit to New York City.  It was first sung in 1908 at a follies show at Stillwater's Grand Opera House. Ever since, it has been a tradition to play the song at Oklahoma State athletic events. The only real change over the years has been to replace "OAMC" with "Oklahoma State."

Conference history
 Independent (1901–1914)
 Southwest Conference (1914–1924)
 Missouri Valley Intercollegiate Athletic Association (1924–1927)
 Missouri Valley Conference (1927–1956)
 Independent (1956–1957)
 Big Eight Conference (1957–1996)
 Big 12 Conference (1996–present)

Varsity teams

Oklahoma State is one of only two Power 5 schools that do not sponsor women's volleyball, the other one being Vanderbilt, and barring a later addition of the sport will be the only such school once Vanderbilt adds women's volleyball in 2025. (All four schools that will join the Big 12 in 2023—BYU, Cincinnati, Houston, and UCF—sponsor the sport.)

Basketball

Men's basketball

Oklahoma State first took the basketball court in 1908.
Under head coach Henry Iba, the team won NCAA championships in 1945 and again in 1946.  A&M center Bob Kurland was named the NCAA Tournament MVP during their two championship seasons. Kurland was the first player to win the honor two times. Oklahoma State has a total of six Final Four appearances.

Under Eddie Sutton, the team made two Final Four appearances—in 1995 and in 2004. Sutton's son, Sean Sutton, began coaching the team in 2006 but resigned on March 31, 2008. The team is now coached by Mike Boynton Jr., who was promoted to head coach after Brad Underwood departed to become head coach of the Illinois Fighting Illini.

Women's basketball

Oklahoma State first fielded a women's team during the 1972-1973 season. The team's head coach is currently Jim Littell, who took over after their former head coach Kurt Budke was killed in a plane crash in Arkansas in November 2011, just after the season had started.

Baseball

The Cowboys won their only national championship in 1959, but have finished runner-up on five other occasions. Oklahoma State won 16 consecutive conference championships under head coach Gary Ward in the Big 8 Conference. During that time, Pete Incaviglia was named Baseball America's Player of the Century, and Robin Ventura was inducted in the inaugural class into the College Baseball Hall of Fame. Overall, Oklahoma State has made 19 College World Series appearances, including seven straight from 1981–1987.

The Cowboys' current head baseball coach is Josh Holliday.

Football

The Oklahoma State football program has participated in 28 bowl games overall and have been to 11 straight. There have been 11 conference championships won, one Heisman Trophy winner, two National Football League Hall of Fame members, and 53 All-Americans to the Cowboys' name.

Oklahoma State plays football on Lewis Field, in Boone Pickens Stadium.

The Cowboys all-time record is 566-539-47.

The current head coach is Mike Gundy (94-46 and 6–3 in bowl appearances). During Gundy's playing career, the Cowboys have enjoyed six 9+ win seasons in the past eight seasons. Gundy coached the team to a record 12 win season in 2011, culminating with a Fiesta Bowl victory over Stanford. His accolades consist of the 2010 Big 12 Coach of the Year, 2011 Eddie Robinson National Coach of the Year, 2011 Paul "Bear" Bryant National Coach of the Year, and the 2011 American Football Monthly National Coach of the Year.

The 1945 Oklahoma A&M team was retroactively awarded a national title in October 2016 by the American Football Coaches Association. The Aggies finished with a 9-0 record, completing the season with a 33-13 win over St. Mary's College in the Sugar Bowl.

Barry Sanders won the Heisman Trophy in 1988.

Author Steve Budin, whose father was a New York bookie, has recently publicized the claim that the 1954 "Bedlam" game against rival OU was fixed by mobsters in his book Bets, Drugs, and Rock & Roll.

Golf
Karsten Creek serves as the home course of the Oklahoma State University men's and women's golf teams. The Tom Fazio layout was named Golf Digests "Best New Public Course" and served as the host site for the NCAA Men's Championship in 2003, 2011, and 2018.

The men's program has qualified for the NCAA Championship 74 times in 75 years – from 1947 to 2022, the only year they did not qualify was 2012. They have won 11 national championships (1963, 1976, 1978, 1980, 1983, 1987, 1991, 1995, 2000, 2006, 2018), 9 individual national championships (Earl Moeller in 1953, Grier Jones in 1968, David Edwards in 1978, Scott Verplank in 1986, Brian Watts in 1987, E. J. Pfister in 1988, Charles Howell III in 2000, Jonathan Moore in 2006, Matthew Wolff in 2019), and 56 conference championships.

Numerous Cowboys from the men's team have gone on to success in professional golf on both the PGA and European Tours, including Bob Tway (8 PGA Tour wins, including 1986 PGA Championship), Hunter Mahan (6 PGA Tour wins, including 3 WGC events), Rickie Fowler (5 PGA Tour wins, including 2015 Players Championship, and 2 European Tour wins), Scott Verplank (5 PGA Tour wins), Danny Edwards (5 PGA Tour wins), David Edwards (4 PGA Tour wins), Michael Bradley (4 PGA Tour wins), Mark Hayes (3 PGA Tour wins, including 1977 Players Championship), Charles Howell III (3 PGA Tour wins), Bob Dickson (2 PGA Tour wins), Bo Van Pelt (one win each on PGA Tour and European Tour), Willie Wood (one PGA Tour win), Kevin Tway (one PGA Tour win), Pablo Martín (3 European Tour wins), Matthew Wolff (1 PGA Tour win), Viktor Hovland (2 PGA Tour wins), and Peter Uihlein (1 European Tour win). Additionally, Brian Watts went on to great success on the Japan Golf Tour, earning 12 wins.

The women's program has also had its share of success. Under former coach Ann Pitts, the Cowgirls won 15 conference championships and made 15 appearances at the NCAA Championship. Laura Matthews led the Cowgirls to be Big 12 champions in 2005 and a top-20 finish at the NCAA Championship. Caroline Hedwall won the NCAA Division I individual championship in 2010 under new coach Annie Young.

Conference championships:
 Men
 Missouri Valley Conference (9): 1947, 1948, 1949, 1950, 1951, 1952, 1953, 1954, 1955
 Big Eight Conference (36): 1958, 1959, 1960, 1961, 1962, 1963, 1964, 1965, 1966, 1967, 1969, 1970, 1971, 1972, 1973, 1974, 1975, 1976, 1977, 1978, 1979, 1980, 1981, 1982, 1983, 1985, 1986, 1987, 1988, 1989, 1990, 1991, 1993, 1994, 1995, 1996
 Big 12 Conference (10): 1997, 1998, 2000, 2005, 2007, 2008, 2009, 2010, 2011, 2019, 2021
 Women
 Big Eight Conference (14): 1977, 1979, 1980, 1982, 1984, 1985, 1986, 1987, 1988, 1989, 1992, 1994, 1995, 1996
 Big 12 Conference (10): 1999, 2001, 2002, 2003, 2005, 2008, 2009, 2013, 2016, 2021

Softball

Oklahoma State's softball team has appeared in twelve Women's College World Series, in 1977, 1980, 1981, 1982 (AIAW), 1982 (NCAA), 1989, 1990, 1993, 1994, 1998, 2011 and 2019. In 1982, the Cowgirls played in both the last AIAW WCWS and days later the first NCAA WCWS. After having played their way through the 1982 regular season, a conference tournament, NCAA first round, winning an AIAW regional title, a loss in the AIAW WCWS final, the team's marathon season ended with 13-inning and 14-inning one-run losses in the NCAA tournament.

Wrestling

Oklahoma State wrestling's tradition started in 1916 when Edward C. Gallagher, whose name is part of Gallagher-Iba Arena, became head coach. With his expertise in anatomy, he pioneered the sport of wrestling. Gallagher coached the Cowboys until his death in 1940 from pneumonia. During those 24 years, Gallagher had 11 team national titles, 19 undefeated seasons, and a 138-5-4 record.

After Gallagher's death, Art Griffith took over and proceeded to win two straight national championships. Due to World War II, Oklahoma State wrestling was forced off the mat for three years. After the war, Griffith coached for another 11 years and won six more national championships in that time. Due to health reasons, Art Griffith resigned as head coach and Myron Roderick took over. At 23 years old, Roderick became the youngest coach to win a national championship in 1958. Roderick proceeded to win another 5 championships. In 1970, Myron Roderick stepped down to take an executive position with the U.S. Wrestling Federation. Former Stillwater High School coach Tommy Chesbro was hired as head coach and won eight Big Eight titles and one national championship in 15 years. Between 1985 and 1991, Joe Seay, former Cal State coach won five conference titles and two national titles.

In 1993, John Smith became the seventh head coach of Oklahoma State University wrestling. Smith led the Cowboys to a national title in 1995 and four consecutive national titles between 2002–2006.

Notable non-varsity sports

Rugby
Founded in 1974, the Oklahoma State University Rugby Football Club plays college rugby in the Division 1 Heart of America conference against several of its traditional Big 8 / Big 12 rivals.  The Cowboys are led by head coach Miles Hunter. Oklahoma State also has a women’s rugby team that plays in the Mid-America college rugby conference.

Cheerleading
The Oklahoma State University Cheerleaders compete in the National Cheerleaders Association in Division 1A coached by Lindsay Bracken.

They have won 16 NCA national team championships and two group stunt national championships in the following divisions:

NCA Large Co-Ed Div. 1A - 2021, 2022

NCA Cheer Division 1A  - 1988, 1991, 2010, 2012, 2013, 2014, 2015

NCA All-Girl 1  - 1988, 1990, 1995, 1996

NCA Small Co-Ed 1A - 2012, 2019

NCA Small Co-Ed 1 - 2007

NCA Group Stunts - 2014, 2015

STUNT
The Oklahoma State University STUNT team competes in Stunt (sport) Division 1A coached by Lindsay Bracken.

They have won 8 consecutive national team championships in the following years: 2014, 2015, 2016, 2017, 2018, 2019, 2021, 2022

Championships

NCAA team championships
Oklahoma State has won 52 NCAA team national championships.Men's (52) Baseball (1): 1959 
 Basketball (2): 1945, 1946
 Cross Country (4): 1954, 2009, 2010, 2012
 Golf (11): 1963, 1976, 1978, 1980, 1983, 1987, 1991, 1995, 2000, 2006, 2018
 Wrestling (34): 1928*, 1929, 1930, 1931*, 1933*, 1934, 1935, 1937, 1938, 1939, 1940, 1941, 1942, 1946, 1948, 1949, 1954, 1955, 1956, 1958, 1959, 1961, 1962, 1964, 1966, 1968, 1971, 1989, 1990, 1994, 2003, 2004, 2005, 2006
 Football (1): 1945
(*) Unofficial NCAA team national championships
 See also:
 Big 12 Conference national team titles
 List of NCAA schools with the most NCAA Division I championships

Other national team championships
Listed below are five national team titles in current and emerging NCAA sports that were not bestowed by the NCAA.Men's (1)Football (1): 1945aWomen's (5)Equestrian:
(Varsity Western) (4): 2003, 2004, 2006, 2013
(Dual discipline) (1): 2022
a The AFCA established a "Blue Ribbon Commission" in 2016 to begin retroactively selecting Coaches' Trophy winners from 1922 through 1949. OSU was the only team to apply for any of the 28 years considered.

Below are five national team titles won by Oklahoma State teams at the highest collegiate levels in non-NCAA sports:All (5)'''
Equestrian (AQHA western) (1): 2000
Flying (aviation) (2): 1971, 1975
Rodeo (women's)'' (2): 2001, 2004
 See also:
 List of NCAA schools with the most Division I national championships
 Intercollegiate sports team champions

See also
 List of Oklahoma State University Olympians

References

External links

 

 
Oklahoma State University